Jianwai Subdistrict is a subdistrict on the western side of Chaoyang District, Beijing, China. It borders Hujialou and Chaowai Subdistricts to the north, Balizhuang Subdistrict and Gaobeidian Township to the east, Shuangjing Subdistrict to the south, Jianguomen and Chaoyangmen Subdistricts to the west. As of 2020, it has a total population of 36,414.

The name of this subdistrict is an abbreviation of Jianguomenwai Subdistrict, referring to its location outside of Jianguomen and the former Beijing city wall.

History

Administrative Division 
At the end of 2021, there are a total of 9 communities under Jianwai Subdistrict:

References 

Chaoyang District, Beijing
Subdistricts of Beijing